Adeline Bourne (January 1873 - 8 February 1965) was an Anglo-Indian actress, suffragette and charity worker.

Life
Adeline Bourne was born in India on 8 January 1873. She was sent to private schools in Eastbourne and Blackheath, though after expulsion from three schools was educated by a governess. She studied drama under Sarah Thorne, becoming a member of Thorne's company before leaving to tour America with Mrs Patrick Campbell. She then worked for J. E. Vedrenne and Harley Granville-Barker at the Court Theatre, and for Olga Nethersole. At the start of the twentieth century she appeared in avant-garde and feminist plays.

In 1908 she helped found the Actresses' Franchise League, and served as its Joint Secretary. She set up the New Players Society in 1911.  In 1915 she founded the British Women's Hospital, which raised £150,000 to establish the Royal Star and Garter Home for disabled soldiers. During World War I she served abroad as an officer in Queen Mary's Army Auxiliary Corps. 

Between 1915 and 1963 Bourne raised over £750,000 for different causes. For example, she raised £37,500 for the Elizabeth Garrett Anderson Hospital. In 1928 she was Vice President of the Association for Moral and Social Hygiene's Josephine Butler Appeal Fund. After World War II she started a women's employment organization to help women return to civilian jobs. In the mid-1950s she established the Wayfarers' Trust, a nursing home and hospital for older people.

After Bourne's death in 1965 a fire destroyed her home in Thurston, Suffolk. Though her papers were rescued from the fire, they were subsequently destroyed in 2013.

References

1873 births
1965 deaths
British people in colonial India
British actresses
British suffragists
British philanthropists